The 2004 Premier League speedway season was the second division of speedway in the United Kingdom and governed by the Speedway Control Board (SCB), in conjunction with the British Speedway Promoters' Association (BSPA).

Season summary
The League consisted of 15 teams for the 2004 season after the Swindon Robins and Arena Essex Hammers elected to compete in the Elite League and the closure of the Trelawny Tigers.

The League was run on a standard format with no play-offs and was won by Hull Vikings.

Final table

Premier League Knockout Cup
The 2004 Premier League Knockout Cup was the 37th edition of the Knockout Cup for tier two teams. Hull Vikings were the winners of the competition.

First round

Quarter-finals

Semi-finals

Final
First leg

Second leg

Hull were declared Knockout Cup Champions, winning on aggregate 99–91.

Final leading averages

Riders & final averages
Berwick

Adrian Rymel 7.62
Michal Makovský 7.23 
Lee Smethills 7.19
Claus Kristensen 6.80
Adam Pietraszko 6.70
Josef Franc 6.66
Ritchie Hawkins 6.20
Simon Cartwright 6.01
David Meldrum 5.80
Blair Scott 3.71
Tom Brown 2.47

Edinburgh

Frede Schott 9.53 
Rory Schlein 8.94 
Peter Carr 8.07 
Theo Pijper 6.48
Matthew Wethers 5.26
Cameron Woodward 4.64
Sean Stoddart 1.22

Exeter

Mark Lemon 9.39
Graeme Gordon 7.74
Roger Lobb 7.55
Mark Simmonds 7.47 
Seemond Stephens 7.41
Michael Coles 7.14
Nick Simmons 3.61

Glasgow

Shane Parker 9.58
George Štancl 8.56
James Grieves 8.11
Paul Bentley 7.98
Graham Jones 6.31
Eric Carrillo 5.93
David McAllan 4.09
Corey Blackman 2.57
James Cockle 2.08
Barry Campbell 1.94

Hull

Magnus Karlsson 8.50 
Garry Stead 7.92
Paul Thorp 7.90
Ross Brady 7.68
Emil Kramer 7.60
Emiliano Sanchez 7.45
Joel Parsons 4.79
Danny Norton 1.71

Isle of Wight

Craig Boyce 9.47 
Jason Bunyan 7.67
Sebastien Trésarrieu 7.53
Ray Morton 6.82
Krister Marsh 6.71
Ulrich Østergaard 6.68
Glen Phillips 6.24
Chris Johnson 3.23

King's Lynn

Tomáš Topinka 8.74
Kevin Doolan 7.70
Shaun Tacey 7.23
Tom P. Madsen 6.86
Adam Allott 6.75
Paul Lee 6.53
James Brundle 4.97
Trevor Harding 4.00
Darren Mallett 3.26

Newcastle

Jason Lyons 10.13
Richard Juul 6.16
Kristian Lund 6.06
Kevin Little 5.98
Lee Dicken 5.39
Lee Smethills 5.22
Jamie Robertson 4.77
William Lawson 4.03
Scott Smith 3.81
Luboš Tomíček Jr. 3.56

Newport

Craig Watson 9.66
Mads Korneliussen 6.95
Kristian Lund 6.10
Pavel Ondrašík 5.50
Tony Atkin 5.32
Carl Wilkinson 4.82
Luke Priest 2.43
Karl Mason 2.33
Barrie Evans 2.26

Reading

Matej Žagar 10.02
Danny Bird 9.67
Phil Morris 8.18
Andrew Appleton 8.10
Chris Schramm 5.01
Chris Mills 4.51
Steve Braidford 2.46
Jamie Westacott 1.83

Rye House

Davey Watt 8.43 
Brent Werner 8.18 
Chris Neath 7.71 
Scott Robson 7.02
Steve Masters 6.46
Tommy Allen 4.61
Steve Boxall 4.07
Luke Bowen 1.57

Sheffield

Sean Wilson 9.69
Andre Compton 8.92 
Ricky Ashworth 8.29
Andrew Moore 7.39
Richard Hall 5.48
James Birkinshaw 5.28
Ben Wilson 5.15

Somerset

Glenn Cunningham 8.02 
John Jorgensen 7.96
Paul Fry 7.48
Neil Collins 6.72
Jamie Smith 6.02
Matt Read 5.23
Steve Bishop 4.79
Simon Walker 3.15

Stoke

Jan Staechmann 9.04 
Paul Pickering 8.48
Alan Mogridge 8.28
Robbie Kessler 6.78
Paul Clews 5.47
Trent Leverington 5.06
Rob Grant Jr. 3.89
Daniel Giffard 2.51

Workington

Simon Stead 10.01 
Carl Stonehewer 9.84 
Kauko Nieminen 6.92
Rusty Harrison 6.66
Brett Woodifield 6.15
Aidan Collins 5.73
James Wright 5.48

See also
List of United Kingdom Speedway League Champions
Knockout Cup (speedway)

References

Speedway Premier League
2004 in speedway
2004 in British motorsport